Fred Dewey (July 11, 1957 – June 2, 2021) was a writer, artist, publisher, educator, and civic activist. He was the co-founder of the Neighborhood Councils Movement in Los Angeles. He directed the Beyond Baroque Literary Arts Center in Los Angeles from 1996 to 2010 and has edited and published over twenty books on Ammiel Alcalay, Simone Forti, Jean-Luc Godard, Daniel Berrigan, Abdellatif Laabi, Jack Hirschman, Christoph Draeger, Ed Ruscha, Diane di Prima.

In the mid-1990s, Dewey founded The Hannah Arendt Working Group in Los Angeles. In 2010, Dewey led the free, public seminar on the works of German-born American political theorist Hannah Arendt in Berlin, Paris, London, Oslo, Amsterdam, and Los Angeles, at public spaces, squats, and universities.

Dewey was on the faculty of the fine arts graduate program at ArtCenter College of Design in Pasadena, CA. He also taught at the Frei Universitat in Berlin and Cal Arts in Valencia, California

Education 
Fred Dewey graduated from Phillips Exeter Academy in New Hampshire, and studied semiotics at Brown University.

Beyond Baroque 
During his time as director of Beyond Baroque, Dewey created the publishing house Beyond Baroque Books and launched The World Beyond Poetry Festival in 2000.

Publications 

 The School of Public Life, Errant Bodies Press, 2014
 from an apparent contradiction in Arendt to a working group method, re:public, 2016
 Declaration, Beyond Baroque Books, 2009
 A Little History, Beyond Baroque Books, 2013
 Truth Etc., Beyond Baroque Books, 2006
 Site Specific Sound, 2004
 From the Warring Factions, UpSet Press, Incorporated, 2013
 he Lowndes County Idea: Two Conversations, 2009
 Lucas Reiner: Los Angeles Trees, Prestel, 2008

References

External links 
 Beyond Baroque
 Jeremiah Day / Simone Forti / Fred Dewey  at Institute of Contemporary Art, Los Angeles
 Fred Deweys mobile Hannah Arendt Working Group in Berlin 

1957 births
2021 deaths
Writers from Los Angeles
Brown University alumni